U-24 may refer to one of the following German submarines:

 , was a Type U 23 submarine launched in 1913 and that served in the First World War until surrendered on 22 November 1918
 During the First World War, Germany also had these submarines with similar names:
 , a Type UB II submarine launched in 1915 and surrendered on 24 November 1918
 , a Type UC II submarine launched in 1916 and sunk on 24 May 1917
 , a Type IIB submarine that served in the Second World War until scuttled on 25 August 1944

Submarines of Germany